Farouk Ben Mustapha (born 1 July 1989) is a Tunisian professional footballer who plays as a goalkeeper.

Career
Ben Mustapha was voted Ligue Professionnelle 1 player of the month for August 2009 by a fansite.

He was called up to play for Tunisia for the 2010 Africa Cup of Nations but did not play a match in the tournament.

In June 2018 he was named in Tunisia's 23-man squad for the 2018 FIFA World Cup in Russia. He was the substitute goalkeeper in the first Tunisia World Cup game versus England on 18 June 2018.

Career statistics

International

Honours
CA Bizertin
 Tunisian Cup: 2012–13

Club Africain
 Tunisian Ligue Professionnelle 1: 2014–15
 Tunisian Cup: 2016–17

Tunisia
 African Nations Championship: 2011
 African Cup of Nations: fourth place 2019

Individual
 Saudi Professional League Goalkeeper of the Month: January 2020

References

External links

1989 births
Living people
People from Bizerte
Tunisian footballers
Association football goalkeepers
Tunisia international footballers
2010 Africa Cup of Nations players
2011 African Nations Championship players
2013 Africa Cup of Nations players
2015 Africa Cup of Nations players
2018 FIFA World Cup players
2019 Africa Cup of Nations players
Tunisian Ligue Professionnelle 1 players
Saudi Professional League players
CA Bizertin players
Club Africain players
Al-Shabab FC (Riyadh) players
Espérance Sportive de Tunis players
Tunisian expatriate footballers
Tunisian expatriate sportspeople in Saudi Arabia
Expatriate footballers in Saudi Arabia
2021 Africa Cup of Nations players
Tunisia A' international footballers